The 1898 College Football All-Southern Team consists of American football players selected to the College Football All-Southern Teams selected by various organizations in 1898. North Carolina won the SIAA championship.

All-Southerns of 1898

Key
WAL = selected by W. A. Lambeth in Outing. The Vanderbilt Hustler reported his selection of Fitzgerald must have been a mistake, for he was only a sub and in 1896 and 1897, while in 1898 he was no longer on the team.

Ends
H. T. Summersgill, Virginia (WAL)
Herman Koehler, North Carolina (WAL)

Tackles
John Loyd, Virginia (WAL)
Frank Bennett, North Carolina (WAL)

Guards
William S. Fitzgerald, Vanderbilt (WAL)
James Davis, Virginia (WAL)

Centers
John L. Templeman, Virginia (WAL)

Quarterbacks
Frank O. Rogers, North Carolina (WAL)

Halfbacks
Jim MacRae, North Carolina (WAL)
Jack Dye, Vanderbilt (WAL)

Fullbacks
A. Clarence Jones, Georgia (WAL)

See also
South's Oldest Rivalry

References

College Football All-Southern Teams
All-Southern